Yatsu Station is the name of two train stations in Japan:

 Yatsu Station (Akita) (八津駅)
 Yatsu Station (Chiba) (谷津駅)